Shade, Shades or Shading may refer to:
 Shade (color), a mixture of a color with black (often generalized as any variety of a color)
 Shade (shadow), the blocking of sunlight
 Shades or sunglasses
 Shading, a process used in art and graphic design
 Shade (mythology), the spirit or ghost of a dead person
"Throw shade", slang term for an insulting remark

Geography

United States
 Shade, Kentucky
 Shade, Missouri
 Shade, Ohio
 Shade Gap, Pennsylvania
 Shade Township, Somerset County, Pennsylvania
 Shade Creek
 Shades Mountain

People

People with surname
 Absalom Shade (died 1862), Canadian businessman
 Will Shade (1898–1966), American musician
 Dave Shade (1902–1983), American boxer
 Ellen Shade (born 1944), American operatic soprano from New York
 Eric Shade (cricketer) (born 1943), Australian cricketer
 Eric Shade (footballer) (1912–1984), Australian rules footballer
 Hastings Shade (1941–2010), former deputy chief of the Cherokee Nation
 J. Norman Shade (1902–1985), American politician and businessman
 Mariah Shade (born 1991), Trinidadian soccer forward
 Nancy Shade (born 1949), soprano, singing-actress
 Ronnie Shade (1938–1986), Scottish professional golfer
 Sam Shade (born 1973), American assistant special teams coach and former football safety
 Rocky Shades (born 1960), English singer

Given name
 Shade (rapper) (born 1987), Italian rapper
 Shade Munro (born 1966), Scottish rugby union player
 Shade Pratt (born 1993), American soccer player
 Shade Rupe (born 1968), American writer, editor, and filmmaker
 Shade Sheist (born 1979), American songwriter and recording artist

Characters
 Shade (comics), an ambiguous villain in the DC universe
 Shade (Dungeons & Dragons), creatures in Dungeons & Dragons
 Shade (Silverwing character), a character in Kenneth Oppel's Silverwing series
 Shade (Sonic the Hedgehog), a character in Sonic Chronicles
 Shade, the Changing Man, a character in the Vertigo Comics imprint
 Shade, a character in Beyond Oasis
 Shade, a character in the Mana series
 Shade, a creature from the Inheritance Cycle by Christopher Paolini
 Shades (comics), the name of a supervillain in Marvel Comics
 Hazel Shade, a character from Pale Fire
 John Shade, a character from Pale Fire

Books
 Shade (novel), by Neil Jordan
 Shades (novel), a 1993 book by Marguerite Poland
 Shades series, a book series by Rob Hood
 "Shades" (story), an 1885 short story by Bolesław Prus
 Shade, the Changing Man (Vertigo), an American superhero comic book featuring the character of the same name

Film and television
 Shade (film), a 2003 crime film by Damian Nieman
 Shades (film), a 1999 film by Erik Van Looy
 The Shade (film), a 1999 film by Raphael Nadjari
 Shades (TV series), a British television series
 Shade, a 2006 film starring Patrick Dempsey
 "Shade" (The Flash), an episode of The Flash

Video games
 Shade (interactive fiction), a 2000 game by Andrew Plotkin
 Shade: Wrath of Angels, a 2004 Computer and Xbox game developed by Black Element Software
 SHADES, a MUD game that existed in the 1980s

Music
 Shades (band), an American R&B group
 Shaed, an American indie pop trio

Albums
 Shades (J. J. Cale album) (1981), the sixth album by J. J. Cale, released in 1981
 Shade (Holly Cole album) (2003), a studio album by Holly Cole
 Shades 1968–1998, a Deep Purple compilation album
 Shade (Murray Head album) (1983), the fifth studio album by Murray Head
 Shades (Andrew Hill album) (1988), an album by American jazz pianist Andrew Hill, recorded in 1986
 Shades (Keith Jarrett album) (1975), the fifth album on Impulse by jazz pianist Keith Jarrett
 Shade, disc two of Mike Oldfield's Light + Shade album
 Shades (Shades album), the only studio album by American R&B group Shades
 Shades (Yellowjackets album) (1986), the fourth studio album from the jazz group Yellowjackets
 Shade (Living Colour album), the sixth studio album by Living Colour

Songs
 "Shades" (1985 song), a 1985 song accompanying commercials for Crown Paints
 "Shade" (Silverchair song) (1995), a song by Australian alternative rock band Silverchair
 "Shade", a 2007 song by The Tossers from Agony
 "Shade", a 2011 song by Nadia Oh from Colours
 "Shades", a 1987 song by Iggy Pop from Blah-Blah-Blah
 "Shades" (Alexandra Savior song), the debut single by American singer-songwriter Alexandra Savior
 "The Shade", a 2015 song by Metric from Pagans in Vegas
 "Shading", a song by All That Remains from the 2002 album Behind Silence and Solitude

Other uses
 Shade 3D, a Japanese graphics software program
 Price shading, variable pricing of a product to different consumers
 Shade number, a rating of the protection offered by welding helmets
 WindowShade, a control panel in Mac OS 7.5
 Window shade, a type of window covering
 The Shades, a part of the twin-city Ankh-Morpork from the Discworld novels
 The Shade (sculpture) and The Three Shades, sculptures by Auguste Rodin

See also
 Shadow (disambiguation)
 Sunshade (disambiguation)
 Shady (disambiguation)